Forever Young, Forever Free (also titled e'Lollipop) is a 1975 South African drama film directed by Ashley Lazarus and starring Jose Ferrer and Karen Valentine.

Plot
A white orphan, Jannie, is dropped off at an orphanage run by a priest and nun in Lesotho, Southern Africa. The boy befriends another orphan, Tsepo, who is black. While playing with a tractor tyre, Jannie rolls down a cliff, severely injuring himself. During this ordeal, he has flashbacks to his parents dying. Jannie is evacuated to New York via a USAF mercy flight, to have his kidneys operated on, due to his injuries. He has permanent renal damage, requiring him to take pills for the rest of his life. The local village raises money so Father Alberto and Tsepo can go to New York. At the airport, Tsepo is mistaken for a school student and lugged onto a school bus, before escaping the school bus in Harlem. Upon meeting a Zulu-speaker, Tsepo is taken to the police and reunited with Father Alberto, before reuniting with Jannie, and exploring New York. They then go back to Lesotho.

Cast
José Ferrer as Father Alberto
Karen Valentine as Carol Anne
Muntu Ndebele as Tsepo
Norman Knox as Jannie
Bess Finney as Sister Marguerita
Simon Sabela as Rakwaba the Witchdoctor
Ken Gampu as Thomas Luke

Reception
Leonard Maltin awarded the film two and a half stars.

References

External links

1970s English-language films
English-language South African films
Afrikaans-language films
South African drama films
Universal Pictures films
1975 drama films
1975 films
1975 multilingual films
South African multilingual films